Timur Sanzharovich Segizbayev (Russian: Тимур Сегизбаев; 12 May 1941 - 15 December 2017) was a Kazakhstani football manager.

Career
While manager of the South Yemen national team, he installed the first stadium in the country with natural grass, allowing them to compete in the World Cup qualifiers.

After the fall of the USSR, he unsuccessfully attempted to establish a Central Asian League.

References

External links
Timur Segizbayev at Footballfacts.ru

Kazakhstani footballers
Association football midfielders
Kazakhstani football managers
1941 births
2017 deaths
Soviet footballers
Soviet football managers
FC Kairat players
FC Kairat managers
Yemen national football team managers
Soviet expatriate sportspeople in Yemen
Soviet expatriate football managers